Villemandeur is a commune in the Loiret department in north-central France.

Geography
The commune is traversed by the river Solin.

Population

See also
 Communes of the Loiret department

References

Communes of Loiret